No. 53 Operational Training Unit RAF was an Operational Training Unit of the Royal Air Force, formed in 1941 to train Spitfire pilots, and disbanded in 1945.

History
53 OTU RAF was an Operational Training Unit of the Royal Air Force. It was formed at RAF Heston in February 1941 to train Spitfire pilots for Fighter Command. In July 1941 it moved to RAF Llandow in Wales, and in May 1943 to RAF Kirton-in-Lindsey in Lincolnshire. Pilots trained initially on Miles Master aircraft and later on Spitfires. 

Had a German invasion of England taken place, 53 OTU RAF would have become No's 553 and 554 Squadron, operating from RAF Church Fenton.

When WW2 ended in Europe, No 53 OTU was disbanded at Kirton-in-Lindsey on 15 May 1945.

Commanding Officers
 March 1943 Wing Commander P H Hamley
 18 May 1943 Group Captain G C Tomlinson
 24 November 1943 Group Captain J G Hawtrey
 18 January 1945 Group Captain M H Rhys

See also
List of Royal Air Force Operational Training Units

References

External Links
53 OTU at nationalarchives.gov.uk Retrieved 9 May 2022
53 OTU at aircrewremembered.com Retrieved 9 May 2022
53 OTU at www.rafweb.org Retrieved 9 May 2022

Operational training units of the Royal Air Force
Military units and formations established in 1941
Military units and formations disestablished in 1945